FK Mjølner is a Norwegian football club from Narvik. It currently plays in the 3. divisjon, after having been relegated from the 2. divisjon in 2019. The club played at the top tier in 1972 and 1989.

History

It is named after Mjöllnir in Norse mythology. It was formed in 1932 when Støa Mjølner (until 1926: FK Steady 1919 Mjølner) and King Mjølner (until 1921: FK Freidig 1918 Mjølner) merged. The club was called Mjølner until 1994, when the name was changed to Mjølner-Narvik. In October 1997 the club merged with local rivals FK Narvik/Nor. The merger club took the name Narvik FK. In February 2005 Narvik FK changed the name back to FK Mjølner.

FK Mjølner was the first club from Northern Norway allowed to play in the Norwegian top division. Before the 1972 season clubs from the north could not gain promotion to the top division. Mjølner played against the best in the 1972 and 1989 seasons, but were relegated both times after just one season.

With the exception of those two seasons, FK Mjølner stayed on the second tier from 1970 to 1991. 1992 saw Mjølner at the third level, which by then was called the 2. divisjon. They got promoted back to the second tier, where they stayed for three seasons from 1993 until they got relegated again in 1995. They played in the 2. divisjon in 1996 and 1997, then merged with Narvik/Nor, and continued playing in that division as Narvik FK until 2001, when they were relegated to the 3. divisjon (fourth tier). After one season at that level they were promoted back to the 2. divisjon again, but in 2004 they were again relegated to the 3. divisjon. With their old name FK Mjølner started the 2005 season in 3. divisjon. In 2010 it won all 26 matches in the 3. divisjon, contested a playoff to win promotion, and succeeded by beating IL Stålkameratene 8–2 on aggregate.

The club has a record 13 Northern Norwegian Cup championships, 9 as Mjølner, and 4 as Narvik/Nor.

Recent history 
{|class="wikitable"
|-bgcolor="#efefef"
! Season
! 
! Pos.
! Pl.
! W
! D
! L
! GS
! GA
! P
!Cup
!Notes
|-
|2009
|3. divisjon
|align=right |2
|align=right|20||align=right|18||align=right|2||align=right|0
|align=right|109||align=right|11||align=right|56
||
|
|-
|2010
|3. divisjon
|align=right bgcolor=#DDFFDD| 1
|align=right|22||align=right|22||align=right|0||align=right|0
|align=right|113||align=right|11||align=right|66
||
|Promoted to the 2. divisjon
|-
|2011 
|2. divisjon
|align=right |8
|align=right|26||align=right|12||align=right|4||align=right|10
|align=right|39||align=right|32||align=right|40
||First round
|
|-
|2012 
|2. divisjon
|align=right bgcolor="#FFCCCC"| 12
|align=right|26||align=right|7||align=right|6||align=right|13
|align=right|26||align=right|41||align=right|27
|Second round
|Relegated to the 3. divisjon
|-
|2013
|3. divisjon
|align=right |2
|align=right|22||align=right|17||align=right|3||align=right|2
|align=right|75||align=right|25||align=right|54
|First round
|
|-
|2014 
|3. divisjon
|align=right bgcolor=#DDFFDD| 1
|align=right|22||align=right|18||align=right|3||align=right|1
|align=right|76||align=right|15||align=right|57
|First round
|Promoted to the 2. divisjon
|-
|2015
|2. divisjon
|align=right bgcolor="#FFCCCC"| 13
|align=right|26||align=right|5||align=right|3||align=right|18
|align=right|21||align=right|67||align=right|18
|Second round
|Relegated to the 3. divisjon
|-
|2016 
|3. divisjon
|align=right|4
|align=right|22||align=right|12||align=right|6||align=right|4
|align=right|54||align=right|31||align=right|42
|Second round
|
|-
|2017 
|3. divisjon
|align=right bgcolor=#DDFFDD| 1
|align=right|26||align=right|20||align=right|2||align=right|4
|align=right|72||align=right|31||align=right|62
|First round
|Promoted to the 2. divisjon
|-
|2018
|2. divisjon
|align=right | 7
|align=right|26||align=right|13||align=right|5||align=right|8
|align=right|41||align=right|41||align=right|44
|Third round
|
|-
|2019 
|2. divisjon
|align=right bgcolor="#FFCCCC"| 14
|align=right|26||align=right|6||align=right|5||align=right|15
|align=right|30||align=right|54||align=right|23
|First round
|Relegated to the 3. divisjon
|}

Players

First team squad

References

External links
 Official web site for FK Mjølner

Association football clubs established in 1932
Mjolner
Mjolner
Sport in Nordland
Narvik
1932 establishments in Norway